Parkside is an area and electoral ward of Barrow-in-Furness, Cumbria, England. It is bordered by Hindpool, Ormsgill, Hawcoat, Newbarns and Risedale and had a population of 5,742 in 2001, reducing to 5,584 at the 2011 Census. It is one of the town's most centralised wards and contains Barrow's main park (hence the ward's name), as well as the newly established Furness Academy.

Abbey Road - Barrow's principal road runs down the entire western side of Parkside. The majority of housing to the west of Abbey Road is terraced and semi-detached, whilst the eastern side of Parkside is predominantly parkland and fields with the exception of some semi and detached housing. 

The ward itself will be combined with Ormsgill ward in April 2023 following formation of the new Westmorland and Furness Local Authority.

There are a number of place of worship in Parkside including Abbey Road Baptist Church, Spring Mount Christian Fellowship and Trinity Church Centre.

Barrow's first synagogue was founded in 1902 on Abbey Road although it closed less than twenty years later.

Barrow Park

Demographics

References

External links
 ONS: Parkside Ward All Statistics
 Cumbria Constabulary: Parkside Ward Profile

Parkside
Wards of Barrow-in-Furness